Deutschlandsberg is a town in Deutschlandsberg district of Styria, Austria. It is located in southern Austria, near the border with Slovenia. It is approximately 35 km from Graz. Popular tourist attractions include the Deutschlandsberg Castle.

Population

References

External links
Official Website (in German)

Cities and towns in Deutschlandsberg District